San Francisco is a town, with a population of 3,437 (2013 census), and a municipality in the Honduran department of Atlántida. The largest town of the municipality is Santa Ana, with a population of 6,776 (2013 census).

References 

Municipalities of the Atlántida Department